John Whittington (1837 – date of death unknown) was an English first-class cricketer.

Born in Yorkshire at Bardsey in 1837, Bleakley made his debut in first-class cricket for the Gentlemen of the North against the Gentlemen of the South at The Oval in July 1858, later playing in the return fixture played at Salford in August. In September of the same year, he played for Manchester in a first-class fixture against Sussex at Eccles. He made a fourth and final appearance in first-class cricket for the Gentlemen of the North against the Gentlemen of the South at Salford in 1860. In his four first-class matches, Whittington scored 40 runs with a high score of 19, while with the ball he took 2 wickets.

References

External links

1837 births
Date of death unknown
Cricketers from Leeds
English cricketers
Gentlemen of the North cricketers
Manchester Cricket Club cricketers